Simplicithyris is a genus of brachiopods belonging to the order Terebratulida, family unassigned.

The species of this genus are found in Kurilo-Kamchatka region.

Species:

Simplicithyris japonica 
Simplicithyris kurilensis

References

Brachiopod genera